Profile is a 2018 screenlife thriller film directed by Timur Bekmambetov, from a screenplay by Bekmambetov, Britt Poulton, and Olga Kharina, based upon the non-fiction book In The Skin of a Jihadist by Anna Erelle. It stars Valene Kane, Shazad Latif, Christine Adams, Amir Rahimzadeh and Morgan Watkins.

The film had its world premiere at the 68th Berlin International Film Festival on February 17, 2018, in the Panorama section. It was released in the United States on May 14, 2021, by Focus Features, and received mixed reviews from critics.

Plot 

In order to investigate the recruitment of a young European women by ISIS, journalist Amy Whittaker creates a new Facebook profile under the alias of Melody Nelson. She creates a persona online of a woman who has recently converted to Islam.

Soon Amy is contacted by Bilel, an ISIS fighter from Syria. They begin to talk to each other regularly and after some time she begins to develop real romantic feelings for him.

Cast 
 Valene Kane as Amy Whittaker
 Shazad Latif as Bilel
 Christine Adams as Vick
 Morgan Watkins as Matt
 Amir Rahimzadeh as Lou 
 Emma Cater as Kathy
 Marie Hamilton as Waitress

Production
The film is based on French journalist Anna Erelle's book In the Skin of a Jihadist about her investigation into the recruitment of young women by ISIS.

Release
The film had its world premiere at the Berlin International Film Festival on February 17, 2018. It also screened at South by Southwest on March 11, 2018. In March 2021, Focus Features acquired distribution rights to the film, and set it for a May 14, 2021, release.

Reception

Box office 
In the United States, Profile was released alongside Spiral, Those Who Wish Me Dead, and Finding You, and grossed $260,000 from 2,033 theaters on its first day of release. It went on to debut to $730,290, finishing ninth at the box office.

Critical response 

On review aggregator website Rotten Tomatoes, the film holds an approval rating of 61% based on 94 reviews, and an average rating of 6/10. The site's critics consensus reads: "Profiles unique narrative gimmick is enough to carry the film partway, but it's ultimately overwhelmed by an increasingly ludicrous plot." On Metacritic, the film has a weighted average score of 54 out of 100, based on 22 critics, indicating "mixed or average reviews". Audiences polled by CinemaScore gave the film an average grade of "B" on an A+ to F scale, while PostTrak reported 65% of audience members gave it a positive score, with 37% saying they would definitely recommend it.

The film won the Panorama Audience Award at the Berlinale.

References

External links
 

2018 films
2018 thriller films
2010s mystery thriller films
American mystery thriller films
British mystery thriller films
Films directed by Timur Bekmambetov
Focus Features films
Films about Islamic State of Iraq and the Levant
Bazelevs Company films
Screenlife films
2010s English-language films
2010s American films
2010s British films